is one of Japan's top competitors in the sport of drifting. Born in Okinawa, Japan, but raised in San Gabriel Ca, he was taught by his father Tsukasa Gushi at the age of 13 with a Toyota AE86. Ken has become the youngest competitor in both the D1 Grand Prix of Japan and the Formula Drift Championships of the U.S. when he was 16, despite not passing his driving test at the time.

Racing career

Ken reached #1 qualified, but loss at top 16 tandems, in 2004 Formula Drift Championship very first round at Road Atlanta.

A few weeks after Road Atlanta, Ken won the $10,000.00 Winner-Take All International Drifting Shoot-Out at the Road & Track U.S. Sports Car Invitational (30 April 2004 - 2 May 2004), part of the Mazda and Yokohama-sponsored event at Mazda Raceway Laguna Seca. Here at this famous race course, it hosted its first ever professional drifting competition, where 14 teams/drivers competed for the right to take home a $10,000 cash prize, the largest jackpot in drifting history in the U.S.

Ken, piloting Rotora's Nissan 240SX took top honors as he defeated Japanese Pro D1 driver Kazu Hayashida of RS-R in the best 8, before eliminating Samuel Hübinette with Team Mopar/Lateral G Racing 500+ horsepower Dodge Viper in the semi finals en route to the finals against Rhys Millen with Team RMR's Pontiac GTO. Seventeen-year-old Ken Gushi, the youngest competing driver in D1 Grand Prix history bested Rhys Millen with a series of consistent bumper to bumper tandem drifting runs.

Finishing the 2004 Formula Drift season with his Nissan 240SX, Ken jumped into the Ford Racing backed Mustang GT in the 2005 series, finishing off the year in 3rd place overall, and winning the third round of the season in Houston, Texas to become Formula D's first Japanese-born event winner.

In 2007, following his father's dreams, Ken took on the challenge to race at the Pikes Peak International Hill Climb. Though he had qualified 3rd place in the Pike's Peak Open class, Ken miscalculated a corner, taking the car off course.

Also, in 2007 he participated in the Forza Motorsport Showdown piloting the Royal Purple Team 350Z.

In 2008, Ken was picked up by Scion Racing and RS-R to pilot the first ever RWD converted Scion tC. This was done by using the Toyota Avensis chassis (which the Scion tC is based on and is originally an AWD platform) and first ever converted it into a RWD car.

In 2009, Ken got 2nd place at Sonoma.  He ended up finishing 10th.

In 2010, Ken finished 15th.

April 16, 2011 Ken takes first place in the 35th annual Toyota Pro Celebrity Race at the Long Beach Grand Prix.  Ken joined fellow Scion Racing driver, Christian Rado in the track modified tCs for the 10 laps of competition.  Ken finished in first place for the Pro category and 2nd overall behind actor William Fichtner.

June 2011, Ken takes 3rd place in the Formula Drift Asia at Singapore.

In 2011, Ken finished 14th in the 2010 Scion Racing tC.

For the 2012 Formula Drift season, Gushi is driving the 2013 GPP Scion Racing FR-S w/ Hankook tires.  In the FR-S, he achieved a 4th-place finish at Round 5: Seattle.

Pokémon Go
Gushi is a Lv.40 Pokémon Master on Pokémon Go, having played the game since the release day. According to his interview on Maximum Driftcast he said: "I wanted to be the very best, the best that ever was. And now I am". He also said that he would give the name Corey Hosford to his most powerful Snorlax.

Personal life

He attended St. Stephens School in Monterey Park, California. He attended Gabrielino High School in San Gabriel, California and Don Bosco Technical Institute in Rosemead, California.

References

External links
Formula D Official Driver Page

Japanese racing drivers
Japanese emigrants to the United States
People from Okinawa Island
People from the San Gabriel Valley
Don Bosco Technical Institute alumni
Drifting drivers
D1 Grand Prix drivers
Formula D drivers
Ryukyuan people
Living people
1986 births